Wang Qiang was the defending champion, having won the event in 2012, but lost in the first round to Wang Yafan.

Karolína Plíšková won the title, defeating Zheng Saisai in the final, 6–3, 6–4

Seeds

Main draw

Finals

Top half

Bottom half

References 
 Main draw

ITF Women's Circuit Sanya Singles
ITF Women's Circuit – Sanya
ITF Women's Circuit Sanya Singles